WCDO-FM (100.9 MHz) is a news and information/adult contemporary radio station in Chenango, Delaware, and Otsego Counties (plus portions of Broome County) in Upstate New York. The station simulcasts its sister station WCDO (1490 AM) and 92.3 FM in Norwich.

WCDO's adult contemporary format includes adult hits and plays songs from the 1970s to the present.  WCDO also claims to be the local news leader with local news 12 times each weekday.  Local sports coverage is also provided covering high school football and basketball for five school districts: Afton, Bainbridge-Guilford, Harpursville, Sidney, and Unatego.

References

External links
WCDO-FM website

Mainstream adult contemporary radio stations in the United States
Delaware County, New York
CDO-FM
Radio stations established in 1983
1983 establishments in New York (state)